The Thibodaux Pilots were a minor-league baseball team based in Thibodaux, Louisiana. The team played in 1954 in the Evangeline League.

In 1954, the Texas City Pilots joined the Evangeline League, but moved to Thibodaux, Louisiana on June 17, 1954, becoming the Thibodaux Pilots.

References

 
Evangeline Baseball League teams
Pilots
Professional baseball teams in Louisiana
Baseball teams established in 1954
Baseball teams disestablished in 1954
1954 establishments in Louisiana
1954 disestablishments in Louisiana
Defunct baseball teams in Louisiana